The Curtiss-Wright CW-15 Sedan was a four-seat utility aircraft produced in small numbers in the United States in the early 1930s. It was a braced high-wing monoplane with conventional tailwheel landing gear with a fully enclosed cabin, superficially resembling the Travel Air 10. At the time of the CW-15's design, Travel Air had recently been acquired by Curtiss-Wright.

Operational history
David Sinton Ingalls used a CW-15 for travel while campaigning for Governor of Ohio.

Variants
CW-15C powered by Curtiss Challenger (nine built)
CW-15D powered by Wright R-760 (three built)
CW-15N powered by Kinner C-5 (three built)

Specifications (CW-15C)

References

Citations

Bibliography
 
 

1930s United States civil utility aircraft
Single-engined tractor aircraft
Aircraft first flown in 1931